TSV 1880 Wasserburg is a German multi-sport club, best known for its basketball department. In 2017 its women's basketball team won its fifth national championship in a row and its eleventh overall.

Titles
 Women's basketball
 Bundesliga
2004, 2005, 2006, 2007, 2008, 2011, 2013, 2014, 2015, 2016, 2017
 German Basketball Cup
2005, 2006, 2007, 2011, 2014, 2015, 2016, 2017, 2018
Source

References

External links
 Official website
 Basketball department

Women's basketball teams in Germany
Rosenheim (district)